Michael Kurtz may refer to:

 Michael L. Kurtz (born 1941), Southeastern Louisiana University historian
 Michael J. Kurtz, astrophysicist
 Mike Kurtz (1845–1904), American burglar and gang leader
 Michael Kurtz, co-founder of Record Store Day